Bangladesh Cable Shilpa Limited or BCSL is a state owned company of the Government of Bangladesh, located on the bank of the Bhairab River in the Shiromoni Industrial Area of Khulna City.

History
The company was established in Khulna, Pakistan, in 1967, and it went into commercial production in 1973. In 2011, it started producing fiber optic cable. As of 2010, the company had been able to make profit every year. Its yearly revenue in 2010 exceeded 1 billion BDT ($14.4M in 2010).

References

Organisations based in Khulna
1967 establishments in East Pakistan
Manufacturing companies established in 1967
Manufacturing companies of Pakistan
Manufacturing companies of Bangladesh